PR2 may refer to:

 PR2 (classification), a Paralympic rowing classification
 Aircrew Survival Equipmentman 2nd Class (US Navy rating); previously designated as 'Parachute Rigger 2nd Class', hence PR2
 London Buses route PR2
 Personal Robot 2 open source robot project by sponsored by Willow Garage
 Google PageRank
 πr2, see Area of a disk
 Polskie Radio Program II, a radio channel broadcast by the Polish public broadcaster Polskie Radio
 VR Class Pr2, a locomotive class

PR-2 may refer to:
 Puerto Rico Highway 2